Petrophila maronialis is a moth in the family Crambidae. It was described by Schaus in 1924. It is found in French Guiana.

References

Petrophila
Moths described in 1924